Gonçalino Feijó de Almeida (born January 28, 1956, in Rio de Janeiro, Brazil) is a jockey in American Thoroughbred horse racing. A riding champion in his native Brazil, he has been racing in the United States since 1990. Based in California, he makes his home in Arcadia near the Santa Anita Park racetrack.

Almeida has won a number of important Graded stakes races in California and at the Fair Grounds Race Course in Louisiana. He has ridden in two Kentucky Derbys with his best result a fourth aboard Jumron in the 1995 running won by Thunder Gulch.

His son, Goncalino, Jr. is a natural science major and star athlete in cross country running at Loyola Marymount University.

References 
 Hollywood Park Racetrack article on Goncalino Almeida

1956 births
American jockeys
Brazilian jockeys
Living people
Sportspeople from Rio de Janeiro (city)
Brazilian emigrants to the United States